Milano School of Policy, Management, and Environment is a graduate school at The New School within The Schools of Public Engagement that offers degrees in environmental policy and sustainability studies, nonprofit management, organizational change management, public policy and urban policy, as well as a PhD. program in public and urban policy and three graduate certificates.

History 

In 1964, The Center for New York City Affairs, a nonpartisan institute, also known as J. M. Kaplan Center for New York City Affairs was founded as the first teaching and research center in the United States devoted to the study of a single metropolitan area. In 1975, under the leadership of Dean Henry Cohen, the Kaplan Center evolved into the Robert J. Milano Graduate School of Management and Urban Policy (now the Milano School of International Affairs, Management and Urban Policy), which was named in honor of the former New School trustee Robert J. Milano (1912–2000), who had also been a member of the advisory board of the J.M. Kaplan Center.

Academics 
Milano offers the following Master's Degrees:
MS in Environmental Policy and Sustainability Management
MS in Nonprofit Management
MS in Organizational Change Management
MS in Public and Urban Policy

Milano offers Graduate Certificates in Organizational Development, Sustainability Strategies, and Leadership and Change.

Students in any master's program at the Milano School can pursue one of the following specializations or work with a faculty advisor to develop their own. The subject areas are sets of related courses that can help students tailor their graduate programs to their personal goals.
 Applied Quantitative Methods and Data Visualization
 Community Development Finance
 Economic and Workforce Development
 Finance
 Food and the Environment
 Global Management
 Global Urban Futures
 Housing and Community Development
 Leadership and Change
 Leading Sustainability
 Politics, Media, and Advocacy
 Social Entrepreneurship
 Social Policy

Milano also offers a PhD Program in Public and Urban Policy, and a joint BA/MS program with Eugene Lang College The New School for Liberal Arts and with the Bachelor's degree in The Schools of Public Engagement.

Accreditation 
The Public and Urban Policy program is accredited by the Network of Schools of Public Policy, Affairs, and Administration.

References

External links

Universities and colleges in New York City
The New School
Public administration schools in the United States
Public policy schools
Universities and colleges in Manhattan
Educational institutions established in 1975